Pro-Air Services is an Air Charter operator based at Luis Muñoz Marín International Airport, San Juan, Puerto Rico. This small charter airline has been in operation since 1981.

Fleet
1 - Aero Commander
1 - Piper Aztec

External links

Air Charter Guide (Search engine)

Companies based in San Juan, Puerto Rico
Airlines of Puerto Rico